Niyaz is an Iranian Canadian musical duo. The group was created in 2004 by DJ, programmer/producer and remixer Carmen Rizzo, vocalist and hammered dulcimer player Azam Ali, formerly of the group Vas, and Ali's husband, Loga Ramin Torkian, of the Iranian crossover group Axiom Of Choice. In 2013, Carmen Rizzo announced via Facebook that he was retiring from Niyaz. "Niyaz" means "yearning" in Persian, Urdu and Turkish.

Niyaz's music, described as "mystical music with a modern edge", is primarily a blend of Sufi mysticism and trance electronica. Niyaz adapts Persian, Indian and Mediterranean folk sounds, poetry and songs including the poetry of Sufi mystic Rumi, with Western electronic instrumentation and programming.

Their self-titled debut album, released in 2005, combined 13th century Sufi and Urdu poetry with "swirling, hypnotic beats". Their 2008 follow-up album, Nine Heavens, featured two discs; the second disc contained acoustic renditions of the tracks on the first disc.

Their third album, Sumud (صمود), released in spring 2012. A companion piece to the album, an acoustic EP with six songs, was released  19 March 2013.

Lyrical sources 

Though they have several songs with original lyrics, the bulk of their lyrics are derived from Persian and Urdu Sufi poetry by the likes of Rumi, Obeyd-e Zakani, Amir Khusrow and Khaju-ye Kermani, and folk songs from Iran, Afghanistan, Pakistan and other parts of the Middle East and central Asia.

The lyrics of their first two albums are almost exclusively in Persian and Urdu, with the exception of a Turkish song on Nine Heavens, but their third album, Sumud featured mostly Persian songs with two songs in Turkish and one each in Palestinian Arabic and the Kurmanji dialect of Kurdish.

Discography

Albums 
 Niyaz (2005)
 Nine Heavens (2008)
 Sumud (2012)
 Sumud Acoustic EP (2013)
 The Fourth Light (2015)

References

External links 
 

Iranian musical groups
Performers of Sufi music
American world music groups
Musical groups established in 2005
Six Degrees Records artists